Starry Night Over the Phone is the third studio album by Australian rap artist Allday. It was released on 12 July 2019. The album spawned four singles: "Wonder Drug", "Protection", "Lungs" and "Restless", featuring The Veronicas. The album's title is a reference to the Vincent van Gogh painting Starry Night Over the Rhône, with the album artwork's use of light also referencing the painting.

At the AIR Awards of 2020, the album was nominated for Best Independent Hip Hop Album Or EP. The album ultimately lost to Sampa the Great's album The Return.

Reception

Anna Rose from The Music AU said the album "is a tender, star-studded offering, one that shows a maturity of soul and sound without washing out his signature hybrid of hip hop and pop." adding "[the] choice in collaborators brings a certain depth to his music." but concluded saying "...without the talents of musicians borrowed from other genres, this would be a pretty bland album." The album was recognised as one of the 20 Best Album Covers of 2019 by Billboard.

Track listing

Personnel
The following people contributed to Starry Night Over the Phone:

 Mario Borgatta – mixing, vocal production, engineer
Simple Integrated Marketing – album artwork design

Charts

Release history

References

2019 albums
Allday albums